Zanjeer is a 1973 Indian Hindi-language action crime film directed and produced by Prakash Mehra, written by Salim–Javed and starring Amitabh Bachchan, Jaya Bachchan, Pran, Ajit Khan and Bindu.At a time when India was suffering from corruption and low economic growth, and the common man was left with frustration and anger over the system, Zanjeer began shifting Hindi cinema in a violent and aggressive direction. This film also ended the struggling period for Bachchan, and turned him into a rising star. The film was a blockbuster success, domestically in India and overseas in the Soviet Union.

It was the first of many collaborations between the screenwriter duo Salim–Javed and Bachchan. Ever since Zanjeer, Salim–Javed wrote many of their subsequent scripts with Bachchan in mind for the lead role, and insisted on him being cast for their later films, including blockbusters such as Deewaar (1975) and Sholay (1975), establishing Bachchan as a superstar. In addition to being a turning point for Bachchan's career and Hindi cinema, Zanjeer was also a turning point for South Indian cinema, with Bachchan's acting inspiring future Tamil Superstar Rajinikanth. Zanjeer remains an important film in the history of Indian cinema and is regarded as a classic today. Dilip Kumar, Dev Anand, Raaj Kumar, and Dharmendra were offered the lead role, but they did not accept the role. It is a matter of common knowledge that it was the romantic era of Rajesh Khanna. Romance was on the rise and Zanjeer did not have a single romance scene between the lead pair Amitabh and Jaya. All actors who refused the film had a serious concern about a dent in their image if they did this film. Bachchan, on the other hand, had little to lose; he chose the film and started his way to superstardom.

Plot
In Diwali, a young Vijay Khanna witnesses the murder of his parents, committed by a man of unknown identity with a white horse on his charm bracelet, Zanjeer. Due to this traumatic event, Vijay has recurring nightmares of a white stallion. Even as a child, Vijay stays socially awkward from the other kids and believes himself to be alone. 20 years later, Vijay has become a Inspector in a town where few are just. He receives complaints about a local man named Sher Khan, who is running gambling dens. When he calls Khan in for questioning, Khan's superiority complex chafes against Vijay's police authority as he scolds the officer, telling him he only orders him around due to his uniform. 

Vijay takes him up on his challenge, and meets him in street clothes to fight him. After the fight, Sher Khan not only closes his gambling dens, but has gained respect for Vijay. He becomes an auto mechanic, and reforms his ways. Various dealings of the crime syndicate continue unabated throughout the town, all tracing back to gang leader named Teja. A mysterious caller continually phones Vijay to inform him exactly when a crime is about to take place, but hangs up before Vijay can extract any more information out of him. When a traffic accident perpetrated by gang members leaves several children dead, a street performer named Mala becomes the witness where she is bribed by Teja's men to keep quiet. Mala is questioned by Vijay, who becomes enraged at her and to sway her differently, takes her into the morgue to view the mangled bodies of the children. 

Mala has a change of heart and comes clean, asking that the bribe be donated to an orphanage. She identifies the man behind the traffic accident. After learning that Mala has broken her word, Teja's men chase after her through the night. She runs, narrowly escaping across the train tracks, and arriving at Vijay's house, desperate for shelter. He allows her to stay, and the two discover that they are both orphans, and discuss the fears associated with living alone. Vijay kindly takes her to his brother and sister-in-law, and, under the sister-in-law's tutelage, Mala begins to learn how to keep the house clean, as well as learn English. Eventually, Teja frames Vijay for bribery, who is later imprisoned for 6 months on false charges. 

When Vijay is released from jail, he plans to take revenge. Mala by this time has developed from a frightened stranger seeking his help to having a romantic interest for him. She begs him, to seal their relationship, that he must stop being so vengeful. He agrees, but soon must come to terms with such a promise. In a Christian cemetery, Vijay encounters the informant who had called him in the past when he was an inspector. The man, De Silva, appears half-insane, holding onto an empty bottle. He tells that several years before on Christmas, his three sons drank poisoned moonshine and died from it. Until the killer is found, he will continue to wander with the bottle. When local criminals mocked him, he vowed to get back at them as he could: by phoning the inspector when a crime was about to happen. 

After hearing this news, Vijay becomes depressed, torn between his desire to help the grieving De Silva, and his need to keep his promise to Mala. Along with a concerted effort by Sher Khan to cheer up Vijay, Mala relents, vowing she will not try to control him and tells him to do what is right. The trail of tainted moonshine leads back to Teja and his men. Upon finally cornering the crook on Diwali, fireworks bursting overhead, Vijay also finds out that the person who murdered his parents, 20 years before, on the same night, is Teja, recognisable by the shackles (Zanjeer) on his wrist. Sher Khan helps him to fight Teja and his men, and take justice into their own hands, until the police arrive. When the hapless police inspector is held at gunpoint by Teja, Vijay manages to drop to retrieve a pistol from the ground, and shoots Teja dead, who falls into the swimming pool.

Cast
{|class="wikitable"
|-
!Actor/Actress !!Character/Role !!Notes
|-
|Amitabh Bachchan
|Inspector Vijay Khanna  
|Protagonist
|-
|Jaya Bhaduri
|Mala
|
|-
|Pran
|Sher Khan 
|
|-
|Om Prakash
|De Silva
|Special appearance
|-
|Ajit Khan
|Seth Dharam Dayal Teja
|Antagonist
|-
|Bindu
|Mona
|
|-
|Iftekhar
|Police Commissioner Singh
|as Iftikhar
|-
|Keshto Mukherjee
|Gangu
|as Kesto Mukherji
|-
|Randhir
|Lala Ashok
|Sherkhan's friend – Usurer
|-
|Gulshan Bawra
|Street Singer
|Song Deewane Hain
|-
| Sheela Vaz
|Street dancer
|Song Deewane Hain'
|-
|Ram Mohan
|Kabir
|
|-
|Yunus Parvez
|Constable
|
|-
|M. Rajan
|Ranjeet
|Vijay's father
|-
| Purnima 
|Sumitra
|Vijay's mother
|-
|Nandita Thakur
|Shanti Bhabhi
|
|-
|Satyendra Kapoor
|Police Inspector
|as Satyen Kappoor
|-
|Ashalata Wabgaonkar
|Police Inspector's wife
|Vijay's stepmother (as Asha Lata)
|-
|Ram Sethi
|Constable
|
|-
|Sanjana
|Street Dancer
|Song Deewane Hain|-
|Amrit Pal
|Man offered 'Sher Khan' money to kill
|as Amrit Paul
|-
|Bhushan Tiwari
|Smuggler, Teja's man
|as Bhooshan Tiwari
|-
|Javed Khan
|Smuggler, Teja's man
|as Khan
|-
|Ranvir Raj
|Smuggler, Teja's man
|as Ranbir
|-
|Krishan Dhawan
|Smuggler, Teja's man
|as Dhawan
|-
|Mac Mohan
|Man caught in Teja's liquor warehouse
|as Mack Mohan
|-
|D. K. Sapru
|Patil
|as Sapru
|-
|Goga Kapoor
|Goga
|as Goga
|}

Production
The film's story, script, and screenplay were written by Salim Khan, who also conceived the "angry young man" persona of Vijay, played by Amitabh Bachchan. After Khan completed the script, Khan shared the credit with Javed Akhtar, as the screenwriting duo Salim–Javed.Zanjeer was written as a crime film with violent action, and the main character Vijay was conceived as a hard-hitting, 'angry with the system' young man. At a time when Hindi cinema was dominated by romance films with "romantic hero" leads, Prakash Mehra saw the script as potentially groundbreaking and came on board as the film's director. However, they were struggling to find an actor for the lead "angry young man" role, which was turned down by a number of actors due to it going against their "romantic hero" image; at the time, the industry was dominated by the "King of Romance" Rajesh Khanna and similar "romantic hero" actors. The role of the lead was first offered to many leading men of the time, including Raaj Kumar, Rajesh Khanna, Dharmendra, Dev Anand and Dilip Kumar, all of whom turned down the offer. Eventually, it went to a newcomer, Amitabh Bachchan, and established his career.

Salim-Javed were responsible for discovering and casting Bachchan. At the time, Bachchan was a "failed newcomer" who, by the age of 30, had twelve flops and only two hits (as a lead in Bombay to Goa and supporting role in Anand). According to Javed Akhtar, they "saw his talent, which most makers didn’t. He was exceptional, a genius actor who was in films that weren’t good." According to Bachchan, Salim-Javed were close to Rajesh Khanna and could've convinced him to play the role, but they instead opted for the unknown Bachchan. According to Salim Khan, they "strongly felt that Amitabh was the ideal casting for Zanjeer". Bachchan stated, "Salim-Javed saw a fight sequence in Bombay to Goa where I was chewing gum throughout the fight, as an indicator that I would be the right choice for Zanjeer.” Salim Khan was responsible for introducing Bachchan to Mehra.

For the female lead, Mumtaz was initially offered the role. However, she was engaged at the time, and opted out, choosing marriage over career. Jaya Bhaduri, who was engaged to Bachchan at the time, immediately agreed to take the role, for the sake of her future husband.

For the film's promotion, the posters of Zanjeer initially did not have the names of Salim-Javed on them. Salim-Javed hired a man with a jeep to drive around and paint "Salim-Javed" in stencil font on all the Zanjeer posters from Juhu to Opera House. However, the man was sometimes drunk, which led to him painting "Salim-Javed" on the wrong places, such as Pran's face or Bachchan's hands, for some posters.

Crew
Director: Prakash Mehra
Writer: Salim–Javed (Salim Khan, Javed Akhtar)
Producer: Prakash Mehra, Babboo Mehra
Production Company: Prakash Mehra Productions
Editor: Ramchandra Mahadik (as R.D. Mahadik)
Art Director: J. J. Bhende
Cinematographer: N. Satyen
Stunts: Ravi Khanna, Virendra Kumar
Costume and Wardrobe: Vasant Mahajan, Shankar Jadhav
Choreographer: Satyanarayan
Music Director: Kalyanji Anandji
Lyricist: Gulshan Bawra, Prakash Mehra (Dil jalon ka dil jala ke)
Playback Singers: Asha Bhosle, Manna Dey, Lata Mangeshkar, Mohammad Rafi

Soundtrack
The music was composed by Kalyanji Anandji and the lyrics were written by Prakash Mehra, with the exception of 'Yaari Hai Imaan Mera', which was penned by Gulshan Bawra.

Box office
With a total domestic Indian gross revenue of 6 crore in 1973, including a nett collection of  3 crore, the film was declared a "Super Hit" according to Box Office India. This was equivalent to a domestic gross of US$7.75 million in 1973, or US$ million ( 282 crore) in 2016.

It was also an overseas blockbuster at the Soviet box office, where it drew an audience of 37.3 million viewers in 1980. Its overseas gross in the Soviet Union amounted to 9.325 million Rbls (US$14.58 million,  11.46 crore), equivalent to US$ million ( 282 crore) in 2016.

Worldwide, the film grossed a total of  crore ($ million). Adjusted for inflation, its worldwide gross is equivalent to  crore ($ million) in 2016.

Awards and nominations
21st Filmfare Awards:

 Won

 Best Lyricist – Gulshan Bawra for "Yari Hai Imaan Mera"
Best Story – Salim-Javed
Best Screenplay – Salim-Javed 
Best Editing – R. Mahadik

 Nominated

 Best Film – Prakash Mehra Productions
Best Actor – Amitabh Bachchan
Best Supporting Actor – Pran
Best Music Director – Kalyanji-Anandji
Best Male Playback Singer – Manna Dey for "Yari Hai Imaan Mera"

Remakes

A remake, with the same name, released on 6 September 2013. Zanjeer featuring Ram Charan Teja as Vijay, Priyanka Chopra as Mala, Sanjay Dutt as Sher Khan, Prakash Raj as Teja, Mahi Gill as Mona, Ankur Bhatia as Bosco, and Atul Kulkarni. Priyanka Chopra contracted the film for 90 million Indian rupee turning her the highest paid Indian actress. The film is also simultaneously shot in Telugu titled Toofan'', featuring the same cast except Srihari replaces Sanjay Dutt as Sher Khan, and Tanikella Bharani replaces Atul Kulkarni.

Notes

References

External links
 
 

1973 films
1970s Hindi-language films
Films directed by Prakash Mehra
Films about organised crime in India
Films set in Mumbai
Films scored by Kalyanji Anandji
Urdu films remade in other languages
Fictional portrayals of the Maharashtra Police
Hindi films remade in other languages
1970s crime action films
Indian vigilante films
1970s vigilante films
Indian crime action films
Indian police films
Films with screenplays by Salim–Javed
Indian films about revenge